Severity or Severely may refer to:

 Severity (video game), a canceled video game
 "Severely" (song), by South Korean band F.T. Island

See also